Lincoln Township is a township in Harrison County, in the U.S. state of Missouri.

Lincoln Township was established in the 1860s, taking its name from President Abraham Lincoln.

References

Townships in Missouri
Townships in Harrison County, Missouri